Wang Dong may refer to:

Wang Dong (footballer, born 1981), Chinese footballer
Wang Dong (footballer, born 1985), Chinese footballer
Wang Dong (swimmer) (born 1986), Chinese swimmer
Wang Dong (diplomat) (1922–1983), Chinese diplomat
Wang Dong (hacker), Chinese computer hacker